The 2014 Rally Italia Sardegna was the sixth round of the 2014 World Rally Championship season. The event was based in Alghero, Sardinia, and started on 5 June and finished on 8 June after seventeen special stages, totaling 364.5 competitive kilometres.

French driver Sébastien Ogier won the Rally Italia Sardegna for the second time in his career, taking his fourth win of eight victories during the 2014 season.

Entry list

Results

Event standings

Special stages

Power Stage
The "Power stage" was a  stage at the end of the rally.

Standings after the rally

WRC

Drivers' Championship standings

Manufacturers' Championship standings

Other

WRC2 Drivers' Championship standings

WRC3 Drivers' Championship standings

Junior WRC Drivers' Championship standings

References

Results – juwra.com/World Rally Archive
Results – ewrc-results.com

Sardegna
Rally Italia Sardegna
Rally di Sardegna